SAWA is a Japanese singer-songwriter and DJ. In 2009, she signed onto Sony Music Entertainment Japan and joined its sublabel, Epic Records. In 2012, she switched to Bellwood Records and released her 6th mini-album, ソプラノレイン (Soprano Rain).

Biography

In 2008, she debuted on the indies label Cyclops and released two mini-albums. The first mini-album, Colors, was produced by Takeshi Hanzawa from FreeTEMPO and was released on 18 June 2008. Her second mini-album, Time & Space, was produced by a number of musicians, including Ram Rider, A Hundred Birds, and Kentaro Takizawa. It was released on 10 December 2008 on CD and on iTunes, where it topped the iTunes Music Store's dance chart in Japan.

The following year, Sawa made her major label debut on Sony Music Entertainment Japan's sublabel, Epic Records, releasing two mini-albums, I Can Fly and Swimming Dancing. I Can Fly was released on 22 July 2009 with commercial tie-ins to MBS TV fashion program "Dress" and a summer commercial for Honda. The mini-album peaked at No. 145 on the Oricon charts and charted for one week. Swimming Dancing was released on 25 November 2009 and reached a peak position of No. 210 on the Oricon, charting for one week. A new mini-album titled あいにいくよ (Ai ni Ikuyo) was released on 7 April 2010 and saw SAWA working with producers Nawata Hisashi, Jazzin'park, Junya Ookubo Zyun (ANA) and RAM RIDER.

SAWAs first full album title Welcome to Sa-World was released on 7 July 2010. The album featured 7 tracks produced by SAWA herself. After 2 digital download only singles, Mysterious Zone in December 2012 and Good day Sunshine in May 2012, SAWA released her 6th mini-album titled ソプラノレイン (Soprano Rain) on 19 December 2012. The first 5 tracks were produced by SAWA herself. The title track was used in the NHK TV show Minna no Uta.

SAWA went on to write many jingles for Japanese commercials, most famously for Naver's chat client LINE's "LINE Pay" and "LINE Shopping" service promotions. In 2012, SAWA penned and composed the title track of now disbanded 80s/90s revivalist idol/girl unit, Especia's debut single "ミッドナイトConfusion" (Midnight Confusion). In 2015, she produced "ジュリエットのパラドックス" for Ex-BiS member Terashima Yufu's second solo mini-album "好きがはじまるII" (Suki ga Hajimaru 2), "ギザギザのロンリナイ" (Giza Giza no Lonely Night) and for solo Electrodance Idol, KOTO. KOTO and SAWA released a collaboration single entitled "KOTOSAWASISTERS" released at KOTO's 17th birthday live "-Rhymeberry x KOTO x Oyasumi Hologram- Midsummer 3man live!" held at GLAD in Shibuya, Tokyo on 25 September that same year. SAWA has self-covered the songs she has produced for other artists, starting with ミッドナイトConfusion on her 2014 mini-album, Ringa Ringa, which also featured an interlude track for ミッドナイトConfusion featuring the then 6 member line up of Especia. She would later cover ジュリエットのパラドックス and ギザギザのロンリナイ on her 2016 mini-album, Odore Balcony (Dance Balcony). KOTO is featured on the interlude track to "Oboroge Dancing" and KOTO's resident producer Sasaki Kissa produced digital single "Colorful World", both can be found on SAWA's 2017 mini-album, Ijippari Mermaid (Obstinate Mermaid).

Discography

Albums
 Welcome to Sa-World (7 July 2010)

Mini-albums
 COLORS (18 June 2008)
 TIME&SPACE (10 December 2008)
 I Can Fly (22 July 2009)
 Swimming Dancing (25 November 2009)
 あいにいくよ (Ai ni Ikuyo；I Will Go See You) (7 April 2010)
 ソプラノレイン (Soprano Rain) (19 December 2012)

Song appearances
 Gekkan Probowler's fourth album eRETRO
 2. "SUMMER OF LOVE"
 WIRED CAFE Music Recommendation Precious
 8. "Lovefool"
 Suneohair's sixth album Birthday
 9. ""
 Juicy Fruits
 2. "Raspberry Dream"
 Judy and Mary 15th Anniversary Tribute Album
 5. "RADIO"
 Sound Around's second album Every with You
 4. "Every with You" feat. SAWA
 GUNDAM 30th CUSTOM
 8. ""
 Seaside Town
 1. "Samba De Mar"
 RYUKYUDISKO's fourth album Pleasure
 4. "SPLASH☆" feat. SAWA
 Kentaro Takizawa's fourth album Big Room
 9. "Another Landscape" feat. SAWA
 11. "Keep Love Together" feat. The Big Room Family a.k.a. Mika Arisaka and Ryohei with Sawa, Mika Sawabe
 Anan Ryoko's debut album Another Beginning
 12. "Dreaming" feat. SAWA
 16. "Dreaming" feat. SAWA -Japanese Ver.-
 House Nation 3rd Anniversary
 19. "Swimming Dancing"
 MemorieS ~Goodbye and Hello~
 5. ""

References

External links 
 Official Site 
 Official MySpace 
 Sawa Blog 「SAWABURO」 
 PlanetSAWA Fan Blog

Living people
Japanese women pop singers
Japanese-language singers
King Records (Japan) artists
Sony Music Entertainment Japan artists
21st-century Japanese singers
21st-century Japanese women singers
Year of birth missing (living people)